Dylan León Masa, known professionally as Dillom (born December 5, 2000), is an Argentine rapper. Based in Buenos Aires, he rose to fame in 2018 with the self-produced track "Dripping". One of the most prominent figures in the "second wave of Argentine trap", he is known for his "saturated, euphoric" sound and "raw" lyricism. His debut album, Post Mortem, was released in 2021.

Early life 
Dillom was born on 5 December 2000, in Balvanera, Buenos Aires and was raised in Colegiales by his parents. They divorced when he was only 8 years old. His mother became addicted to drugs and eventually ended up in jail, which made Dillom move with his father, who converted to Orthodox Judaism and was living with his new girlfriend. During an interview with El Planteo, he described living with his father negatively: "They went full-on old-fashioned, Orthodox, and I've never been an Orthodox. In fact, I wasn't even Jewish [...] They suddenly made me follow their customs, didn't let me use my phone or do homework on Fridays because it was Shabbat." Their troubled relationship made his father kick him out of the house. Dillom slept in a plaza and later moved with a friend.

Career 

Dillom said to be interested in pursuing a music career since he was a child. He was a bassist in a punk band and, at age 15, produced hip hop beats and instrumentals for local rappers in Barrio 31, a villa miseria in Retiro. This was his first encounter with urban music, a style he would later use for his own compositions. In 2018, he released his debut single "Dripping" and founded the creative team Rip Gang alongside artists Ill Quentín, Muerejoven, Odd Mami, Taichu and Saramalacara. He would later release "Superglue", "Draco", "Casipegado" and collaborated with producer and DJ Bizarrap on "Bzrp Music Sessions Vol. 9", turning him into a viral phenomenon. The Rip Gang marked a "new wave of Argentine trap", causing outrage among earlier rappers, particularly Duki. Fans of the "first wave" disapproved of newer musicians, making Dillom's session with Bizarrap the producer's most disliked video on YouTube.

In 2020, Dillom was featured on Russian punk rock band Pussy Riot's "1312". He founded his own record label, Bohemian Groove, and released his most successful solo single, "Dudade". As of September 2022, the song amassed over 38 million streams on Spotify and over 41 million on YouTube. During an interview with Indie Hoy, Dillom confessed that he didn't like the song initially, although he "felt that people would like it".

In January 2021, Dillom released "Sauce" as a stand-alone single. The song was noted for its funk production, marking a departure from his usual trap sound. In March, he collaborated with cumbia sensation L-Gante on "Tinty Nasty". The song proved to be a hit, peaking at No. 15 on Billboard Hot 100 Argentina and amassing 87 million views on YouTube and 26 million streams on Spotify. They would later become friends, with Dillom expressing admiration for L-Gante's lyricism and sense of humor. In May, he released "Opa" as the lead single from his upcoming debut album Post Mortem. He also released "Piso 13" and "Pelotuda" as second and third singles, respectively, to critical acclaim. In November, the album cover and release date were revealed on social media. Post Mortem was finally released on December 1, 2021.

In February 2022, Dillom kicked off the Post Mortem Tour at Cosquín Rock Festival in Córdoba, Argentina. On 18 March 2022, he performed at Lollapalooza Argentina. In August, Dillom collaborated with Argentine pop duo Miranda! on their single "Dos".

Artistry 
Dillom's music is mostly categorized as trap, although he doesn't relate to the term. During an interview with La Capital, he expressed his disagreement with labels in music. His lyrics were described by Forbes as "elaborate" and "bilingual", packed with pop culture references and "sordid" storytelling. They also depicted him as the "Latino Eminem". When asked about the explicit nature of his lyrics and cancel culture, Dillom said that "art should be a little offending or it would be boring", although he also expressed that "there should be cleverness behind [an offensive line] [...] If it's just an unfunny joke only meant to offend, you're a jerk."

Dillom has said to be influenced by Lil Uzi Vert, 21 Savage, Tyler, the Creator, Daft Punk, Pharrell Williams, Marvin Gaye, Chic, Bee Gees, The Ramones, AC/DC, Snoop Dogg, Cypress Hill, among others. In his songs, he mentions a variety of musicians such as Tame Impala, Elvis Presley, Lil Pump, B.B. King and Red Hot Chili Peppers. His image and visuals are heavily influenced by horror films, most notably A Nightmare on Elm Street, The Texas Chainsaw Massacre, Poltergeist and Chucky. He also describes himself as a "character that reflects [his] most mundane side, the evil side that we all have".

Discography 
Studio albums
 Post Mortem (2021)

With Talented Broke Boys
 Talented Broke Boys, Vol. 1 (2020)

Stand-alone singles
 "Dripping" (2018)
 "Keloke" (featuring Peco) (2018)
 "Superglue" (featuring Ill Quentín) (2019)
 "Draco" (2019)
 "Casipegado" (featuring Muerejoven and Kuribo) (2019)
 "A$AP" (featuring Muerejoven and Haipe) (2019)
 "Kelly" (featuring Muerejoven and KAKTOV) (2020)
 "Dudade" (2020)
 "Sauce" (2021)

References 

2000 births
Living people
Argentine rappers
Argentine trap musicians
Musicians from Buenos Aires